Lesieniec may refer to the following places:
Lesieniec, Lesser Poland Voivodeship (south Poland)
Lesieniec, Łódź Voivodeship (central Poland)
Lesieniec, Warmian-Masurian Voivodeship (north Poland)